Walton Hubbard (October 25, 1874 – November 9, 1954) was a medical doctor who, after nine years of medical practice, quit medicine for Christian Science. He later became a Christian Science practitioner, teacher and lecturer.

Life 
Hubbard was born in Manitowoc, Wisconsin, one of four children, to Harvey F. Hubbard (1830–1915) and Anna Hubbard (née Halsted Warbasse) (1839–1938), a schoolteacher. His father was seven years old when his family moved to Manitowoc, Wisconsin, becoming one of the first pioneer families there. Both of his parents were active in the Presbyterian church, interested in public affairs and social work.

Hubbard's wife, Maude Chase Hubbard (1879 – 1947) was also born in Wisconsin. They lived in Los Angeles, California after having lived in Spokane, Washington. Hubbard lectured in the United States and in Europe. For a number of years, Hubbard was one of two former medical doctors lecturing on Christian Science. John M. Tutt, M.D. was also on the Christian Science Board of Lectureship. He retired from the lecture circuit in 1940.

Published writings and lectures (partial list) 
 "The Crucifixion and the Resurrection", Christian Science Sentinel (November 14, 1953)

See also 
 Edmund F. Burton
 Jer Master

References 

American Christian Scientists
Physicians from Wisconsin
Converts to Christian Science from Presbyterianism
1874 births
1954 deaths